George Roland Bohanon, Jr. (born August 7, 1937) is a jazz trombonist and session musician from Detroit, Michigan.

In the early 1960s, he participated in Detroit's Workshop Jazz ensemble, with Johnny Griffith, Paula Greer, David Hamilton, Lefty Edwards and Herbie Williams. After appearing on several Motown recordings, together with leading musicians such as Hank Cosby, of the Funk Brothers, he went to live in California.

In 1962, he replaced Garnett Brown in the Chico Hamilton Quintet. In 1963 and 1964, he recorded two albums for Motown's unsuccessful jazz Workshop label.

In 1971, he was a member of the Ernie Wilkins Orchestra, playing alongside fellow trombonist Benny Powell, that backed Sarah Vaughan on her A Time in My Life album, recorded in Los Angeles.

Between 1984 and 1993, he played in orchestras backing Frank Sinatra.

Discography
As leader
 Boss: Bossa Nova (Workshop Jazz, 1963)
 Blue Phase (Geobo Music, 1991)

With Karma
 Celebration (Horizon/A&M, 1976)
 For Everybody (Horizon/A&M, 1977)

With Monk Higgins
 Piping Hot (Phono, 1981)

With Miles Davis and Michel Legrand
 Dingo (soundtrack) (Warner Bros., 1991)

As sideman
 1966: The Dealer, Chico Hamilton (Impulse!)
 1971: A Time in My Life, Sarah Vaughan (Mainstream)
 1972: Woga, Charles Kynard (Mainstream)
 1973: Your Mama Don't Dance, Charles Kynard (Mainstream)
 1974: Northern Windows, Hampton Hawes (Prestige)
 1974: Live'n Well, Bert Myrick (Strata)
 1974: Slow Dancer, Boz Scaggs (Columbia Records)
 1975: Stratosonic Nuances, Blue Mitchell (RCA)
 1975: Black Miracle, Joe Henderson (Milestone)
 1975: Places and Spaces, Donald Byrd (Blue Note)
 1976: Eternity, Alice Coltrane (Warner Bros.)
 1976: Everybody Come On Out, Stanley Turrentine (Fantasy)
 1976: School Days, Stanley Clarke (Epic)
 1976: Songs in the Key of Life, Stevie Wonder (Tamla)
 1978: Jazz, Ry Cooder (Warner Bros.)
 1978: Herb Alpert / Hugh Masekela (Horizon)
 1979: We're the Best of Friends, Natalie Cole and Peabo Bryson
 1992: GRP All-Star Big Band (GRP)
 1992: Dave Grusin Presents GRP All-Star Big Band Live!
 1995: All Blues
 1997: Theme for Monterey, Gerald Wilson Orchestra
 1998: 12 Songs of Christmas, Etta James (Private Music)
 2005: Christmas Songs, Diana Krall

References

American jazz trombonists
Male trombonists
1937 births
Living people
Musicians from Detroit
Jazz musicians from Michigan
21st-century trombonists
21st-century American male musicians
American male jazz musicians
Clayton-Hamilton Jazz Orchestra members
GRP All-Star Big Band members
Brass Fever members
Karma (American band) members